EU Strategy for the Danube Region — The European Union's macro-regional strategy for the Danube region, is a long-term policy of the European Union to address the problems of the Danube macro-region.

Adopted by the European Commission on 8 December 2011, in 2011 supported by the European Parliament and the Council of the EU. Developed taking into account the experience of the Baltic Strategy (made possible by the positive results of the latter).

Terms

Tasks 
According to the strategy, 14 countries of the Danube basin by 2020 should implement about 200 projects related to four main areas:

 unification of the Danube region (transport, energy, culture, tourism);
 environmental protection in the Danube region (restoration of water quality, control of environmental risks, preservation of landscape and biodiversity);
 promoting prosperity (development of the “knowledge society” through research in education and information technology, maintaining the competitiveness of enterprises through the development of clusters and complexes, investing in the development of knowledge and skills of employees);
 strengthening the position of the Danube region (including achieving political stability in the region, working together to ensure security, combating crime).

Principles 

 Lack of unnecessary bureaucratic institutions. Projects within the framework of the Strategy are implemented with the involvement of existing European institutions by the relevant ministries of the Danube macro-region. Particular attention is paid to strengthening the effectiveness of bilateral interstate relations.
 No additional financial allocations. Rational use of available appropriations and programs is welcome (around €100 billion by 2013).
 Lack of special European legislation. The European Commission has minimized its own impact on the implementation of the Strategy, limiting itself to a purely coordinating function. The countries of the macro-region have taken responsibility for the implementation of the Danube Strategy, sharing the priority areas.

Participants 
Nine EU member states are involved in the work of the Danube Strategy:

 Austria
 Bulgaria
 Germany (Baden-Württemberg and Bavaria)
 Romania
 Slovakia
 Slovenia
 Hungary
 Croatia
 Czech Republic

and five non-EU countries:

 Bosnia and Herzegovina
 Moldova
 Serbia
 Ukraine (Odesa, Chernivtsi, Ivano-Frankivsk and Zakarpattia oblasts)
 Montenegro

Danube Strategy and Ukraine 
The Ukrainian part of the Danube region covers an area of 68.1 thousand square kilometers, with a total population of 5.9 million people and is represented by four areas, partly located in the Danube basin.

All regions are border, have significant climatic and landscape features, are characterized by the presence of compact ethnic enclaves.

In order to strengthen the economic, scientific, technical, investment, tourism and cultural potential of the Ukrainian regions along the Danube, a Memorandum of Cooperation was signed within the framework of the EU Strategy for the Danube Region.

On January 30, 2013, the First Deputy Minister of Economic Development and Trade of Ukraine Anatoliy Maksyuta was appointed as the coordinator of Ukraine's activities in the implementation of the EU Strategy for the Danube Region.

Since 2015, they have been actively involved in European integration processes, cross-border and regional programs as partners in the Association of Local Governments "EU Strategy for the Danube Region" (Director – Yuri Maslov).

In 2017, the Odesa Oblast Council approved a Perspective Action Plan for the implementation of the EU Strategy for the Danube Region in the Odesa region. 

In order to timely identify and solve environmental problems in the Danube basin and adjacent territories and reservoirs, to achieve a safe state of the environment by monitoring the state of water, soil and air, the Center for Sustainable Development and Environmental Research of the Danube region was established. 

On July 9, 2019, the Association of United Territorial Communities and the Association of Local Self-Government Bodies "EU Strategy for the Danube Region" signed a memorandum of cooperation.

Sources 

 Авторський колектив під загальною редакцією І. В. Студеннікова. Комплексне бачення участі України в реалізації Стратегії ЄС для Дунайського регіону. — Одеса, 2015. — 154 с.
 Васюченок, Л. П. Дунайская стратегия как институциональный механизм развития кооперации (Наука – образованию, производству, экономике: материалы 15-й Международной научно-технической конференции). — Мінськ : БНТУ, 2017. — Т. 4. — С. 74-75.
 EU Strategy for the Danube Region
 (serb.)
 Danube Civil Society Forum
 Єврокомісар Ган називає координаторів пріоритетних напрямків Стратегії ЄС для Дунайського регіону
 Стратегія(rus.) на сайті Дунайської комісії
 Стратегія ЄС стосовно Дунайського регіону на сайті Європейської комісії
 Європейська стратегія розвитку Дунайського регіону. Глосарій термінів
 Громадський простір Дунайського регіону
 Українська делегація взяла участь у Конференції з Дунайського регіону
 Стратегія екологічна // Словник-довідник з екології : навч.-метод. посіб. / уклад. О. Г. Лановенко, О. О. Остапішина. — Херсон : ПП Вишемирський В. С., 2013. — С. 165.

References 

European Commission projects
Politics of the European Union